Vatsan Chakravarthy is an Indian actor, who has appeared in Tamil language films. He has appeared in films including Engaeyum Eppothum (2011) and Tharkappu (2016).

Career
Vatsan debuted as an actor with Aridhu Aridhu (2010), before working on AR Murugadoss's production Engaeyum Eppothum (2011), in which he portrayed a bus passenger who falls in love with a fellow traveller. He subsequently appeared in Rasu Madhuravan's Pandi Oliperukki Nilayam (2012) and in another Murugadoss production, Vathikuchi (2013), where he portrayed a negative role. He played his first lead role in R. K. Kalaimani's Apple Penne (2013), where he worked with actresses Iswarya Menon and Roja.  The film had a low key release and received negative reviews from critics. In mid-2013, he also worked on a single track titled "Thalapathy Anthem", which he dedicated to actor Vijay.

Vatsan was absent from the film industry throughout 2014, after suffering from dengue fever. His next release was Ravi's Tharkappu (2016), where he appeared alongside Shakthi Vasudevan and Samuthirakani.

He had 4 releases in 2019 including his Telugu debut,
Kalavu with kalaiarasan and Lokesh Kanagaraj's Kaithi followed by Nikhil's Arjun suravaram .
His 2022 Release Kuruthiattam as the antagonist with Atharvaa opened to mixed reviews and vatsan earned all praises from the press for his performance

Filmography

References

Living people
Male actors in Tamil cinema
21st-century Indian male actors
Year of birth missing (living people)